Chiara Pellacani (born 12 September 2002) is an Italian diver. She won a gold medal in the 3 m synchro springboard competition at the 2018 European Aquatics Championships.

At the 2020 European Aquatics Championships in Budapest, Hungary, Pellacani won five medals, of which one was gold.

References

External links
 

2002 births
Living people
Italian female divers
Divers at the 2018 Summer Youth Olympics
Divers at the 2020 Summer Olympics
Olympic divers of Italy
World Aquatics Championships medalists in diving
21st-century Italian women
Divers from Rome